Jane Roland Martin (born July 20, 1929) is an American philosopher known for her work on education. She is Professor Emerita of Philosophy at the University of Massachusetts Boston. She has published a number of works relating to issues of gender in education. In 1987, she received a Guggenheim Award for her work.

She contributed the piece "Climbing the Ivory Walls: Women in Academia" to the 2003 anthology Sisterhood Is Forever: The Women's Anthology for a New Millennium, edited by Robin Morgan.

D.G. Mulcahy has published a book length analysis of Martin's work, called Knowledge, Gender, and Schooling: The Feminist Educational Thought of Jane Roland Martin.  Westport, CT: Bergin & Garvey, 2002.  Mulcahy additionally discusses Martin's theory of liberal education in comparison with those of Cardinal Newman and Mortimer Adler in The Educated Person: Toward a New Paradigm for Liberal Education. Lanham, MD: Rowman & Littlefield, 2008.

Joy A. Palmer, in turn, included a chapter on Martin's educational thought in her edited volume, Fifty Modern Thinkers on Education. London: Routledge, 2001, pp. 203–209.

Bibliography
 Reclaiming a Conversation: The Ideal of the Educated Woman. New Haven: Yale University Press, 1985.  Japanese Language Edition 1987.  Korean Language Edition 2002. Swedish Language Edition 2004.
 The Schoolhome: Rethinking Schools for Changing Families. Cambridge, MA: Harvard University Press, 1992.  Turkish Language Edition 1998.  Japanese Language Edition 2007.
 Changing the Educational Landscape: Philosophy, Women, and Curriculum.  New York: Routledge, 1994.
 Coming of Age in Academe: Rekindling Women's Hopes and Reforming the Academy.  New York: Routledge, 2000.
 Cultural Miseducation: In Search of a Democratic Solution.  New York: Teachers College Press, 2002.  Japanese Language Edition, 2009.
 Educational Metamorphoses: Philosophical Reflections on Identity and Culture.  Lanham, MD: Rowman & Littlefield, 2007.
 Education Reconfigured: Culture, Encounter, and Change. New York: Routledge, 2011.

References

1929 births
Living people
University of Massachusetts Boston faculty
American philosophers
American women non-fiction writers
American women academics
21st-century American women